Ruth Manning-Sanders (21 August 1886 – 12 October 1988) was an English poet and author born in Wales, known for a series of children's books for which she collected and related fairy tales worldwide. She published over 90 books in her lifetime

Biography

Childhood 
Ruth Vernon Manning was the youngest of three daughters of John Manning, an English Unitarian minister. She was born in Swansea, Wales, but the family moved to Cheshire when she was three. As a child, she read books and wrote and acted plays with her two sisters.

According to a story she tells in the foreword to Scottish Folk Tales, she spent her summers in a farmhouse in the Scottish Highlands named "Shian", which she says means the place where fairies live.

Education
Manning studied English literature and Shakespearean studies at Manchester University.

Marriage
After returning from a trip to Italy to recover from an illness that forced her to leave university, she went to Devon where she met English artist George Sanders. They married in 1911, and both changed their names to Manning-Sanders. She spent much of her early married life touring Britain in a horse-drawn caravan and working in a circus, a topic she wrote about extensively. The family eventually moved into a cottage in the fishing hamlet of Land's End, Cornwall. One of their two children, Joan Manning-Sanders (1913–2002), found fame as a teenage artist in the 1920s.

Her husband died in an accident in 1953.

Literary career
Manning-Sanders took to publishing dozens of fairy-tale anthologies, mostly during the 1960s and 1970s. She writes in the foreword to a 1971 anthology, A Choice of Magic, that there can't be new fairy tales because they are "records of the time when the world was very young." She rather says that once upon a time is a door through which readers can enter the fairy world and enjoy its magic.

Some of Manning-Saunders's fairy-tale compilations include a discursive foreword on the origins of the tales retold. The stories in A Book of Dragons hail from Greece, China, Japan, North Macedonia, Ireland, Romania, Germany and elsewhere. She goes out of her way to say "not all dragons want to gobble up princesses." The book includes tales of kind and proud dragons, along with savage ones.

In her foreword to A Book of Witches, she offers insight into how she believed fairy tales should usually end, saying:

She also notes in the foreword to A Book of Princes and Princesses that all fairy tales have one thing in common: a happy ending.

While many of Manning-Sanders's tales are not commonly known, she includes stories about more famous figures such as Baba Yaga, Jack the Giant-Killer, Anansi, Snow White, Hansel and Gretel, Robin Hood and Aladdin. The dust jacket for A Book of Giants notes "her wit and good humour. There is not a word wasted."

Death
Manning-Sanders died in 1988 in Penzance, England. Marcus Crouch wrote in the February 1989 issue of The Junior Bookshelf, "For many long-lived writers, death is followed by eclipse. I hope that publishers will continue to re-release Manning-Sanders's priceless treasury of folk-tales. We would all be the poorer for their loss."

Books
She worked for two years with Rosaire's Circus in England. Her novel The Golden Ball. A Novel of the Circus (1954) is said to include parallels with the life of Leon LaRoche, a famed circus performer with Barnum & Bailey Circus from 1895 through 1902.

Manning-Sanders was noted as a poet and novelist in the years up to World War II. At least two of her early poetry collections – Karn and Martha Wish-You-Ill – were published by the Hogarth Press, run by Leonard and Virginia Woolf. Three of her poems appeared in the 1918 volume "Twelve Poets, a Miscellany of New Verse", which also includes ten poems by Edward Thomas. She won the Blindman International Poetry Prize in 1926 for The City, and was for a time a protégée of the English author Walter de la Mare, who spent at least one holiday with the Manning-Sanders family in Cornwall. While living in Sennen, Cornwall, Manning-Sanders was for a time a neighbour of the British writer Mary Butts.

The short story "John Pettigrew's Mirror" appeared in the 1951 anthology "One and All – A Selection of Stories from Cornwall," edited by Denys Val Baker. It was republished at least once, in the 1988 anthology "Ghost Stories" edited by Robert Westall. Her story, "The Goblins at the Bath House" from A Book of Ghosts and Goblins was read by Vincent Price on an LP entitled "The Goblins at the Bath House & The Calamander Chest," published by Caedmon in 1978 (TC 1574).

She began collecting fairy tales into collections in 1966 with the publication of A Book of Dragons. She wrote seven more fairytale collections titled Giants Dwarfs, Witches, Wizards, Mermaids, Ghosts and Goblins and Princes and Princesses. These collections were illustrated by Robin Jacques.

In the late 1960s/early 1970s, she published two collections titled A Book of Devils and Demons and Gianni and The Ogre. Robin Jacques also illustrated A Book of Devils and Demons.

Selected volumes

"A Book of ..." series
These 22 anthologies or collections were published by Methuen (Dutton in the US) and illustrated by Robin Jacques. 
A Book of Giants, 1962
A Book of Dwarfs, 1963
A Book of Dragons, 1964
A Book of Witches, 1965
A Book of Wizards, 1966
A Book of Mermaids, 1967
A Book of Ghosts and Goblins, 1968
A Book of Princes and Princesses, 1969
A Book of Devils and Demons, 1970
A Book of Charms and Changelings, 1971
A Book of Ogres and Trolls, 1972
A Book of Sorcerers and Spells, 1973
A Book of Magic Animals, 1974
A Book of Monsters, 1975
A Book of Enchantments and Curses, 1976
A Book of Kings and Queens, 1977
A Book of Marvels and Magic, 1978
A Book of Spooks and Spectres, 1979
A Book of Cats and Creatures, 1981
A Book of Heroes and Heroines, 1982
A Book of Magic Adventures, 1983
A Book of Magic Horses, 1984
The Library of Congress reports also a 1970 anthology compiled by Manning-Sanders, The Book of Magical Beasts, published by T. Nelson and illustrated by Raymond Briggs "Modern and ancient poems and short stories from around the world about make-believe beasts.".

Other volumes
The Pedlar, 1919 (verse)
Karn, 1922 (verse)
Pages from the History of Zachy Trenoy Sometime Labourer in the Hundred of Penwith, 1922 (verse)
The Twelve Saints, 1926
Martha Wish-You-Ill, 1922 (verse)
The City, 1927 (verse)
Waste Corner, 1927
Selina Pennaluna, 1927
Hucca's Moor, 1929
The Crochet Woman, 1930
The Growing Trees, 1931
She Was Sophia, 1932
Run Away, 1934
Mermaid's Mirror, 1935
The Girl Who Made an Angel, 1936
Children by the Sea, 1938 (published in United States as Adventure May Be Anywhere)
Elephant The Romance of Laura, 1938
Luke's Circus, 1939
Mystery at Penmarth, 1941
The West of England, 1949 (non-fiction)
Swan of Denmark: The Story of Hans Christian Andersen, 1949 (non-fiction)
Seaside England, 1951 (non-fiction)
The River Dart, 1951 (non-fiction)
The English Circus, 1952 (non-fiction)
Mr. Portal's Little Lions, 1952
The Golden Ball: A Novel of the Circus, 1954
Melissa, 1957
Peter and the Piskies: Cornish Folk and Fairy Tales, 1958
A Bundle of Ballads, 1959
Circus Boy, 1960
Red Indian Folk and Fairy Tales, 1960
Animal Stories, 1961 (non-fiction)
Birds, Beasts, and Fishes, 1962 (editor, an anthology of natural history poetry)
The Smugglers, 1962
The Red King and the Witch: Gypsy Folk and Fairy Tales, 1964
Damian and the Dragon: Modern Greek Folk-Tales, 1965
The Crow's Nest, 1965
Slippery Shiney, 1965
The Extraordinary Margaret Catchpole, 1966 (fictionalised biography)
The Magic Squid, 1968
Stories from the English and Scottish Ballads, 1968
The Glass Man and the Golden Bird, 1968 (Hungarian Folk and Fairy Tales)
Jonnikin and the Flying Basket: French Folk and Fairy Tales, 1969
The Spaniards Are Coming!, 1969
Gianni and the Ogre, 1970
A Book of Magical Beasts, 1970 (editor)
A Choice of Magic, 1971
The Three Witch Maidens, 1972
Festivals, 1973
Stumpy A Russian Tale, 1974
Grandad and the Magic Barrel, 1974
Old Dog Sirko: A Ukrainian Tale, 1974
Sir Green Hat and the Wizard, 1974
Tortoise Tales, 1974
Ram and Goat, 1974
Young Gabby Goose, 1975
Scottish Folk Tales, 1976
Fox Tales, 1976
The Town Mouse and the Country Mouse Aesop's Fable Retold, 1977Robin Hood and Little John, 1977Old Witch Boneyleg, 1978The Cock and the Fox , 1978Boastful Rabbit, 1978Folk and Fairy Tales, 1978The Haunted Castle, 1979Robin Hood and the Gold Arrow, 1979Oh Really, Rabbit!, 1980Hedgehog and Puppy Dog, 1982Tales of Magic and Mystery, 1985A Cauldron of Witches, 1988

References

Sources and further reading
Thomson Gale, Contemporary Authors (2004)
M. S. Crouch, The Junior Bookshelf, February 1989
Biographic material culled from introductions and dust jackets of several of Manning-Sanders' books
John Clute and John Grant, The Encyclopedia of Fantasy (1999 updated paperback edition)
Theresa Whistler, The Life of Walter de la Mare (2004)
Nathalie Blondel (Editor), The Journals of Mary Butts (2002)
Donna Elizabeth Rhein, The handprinted books of Leonard and Virginia Woolf at the Hogarth Press, 1917–1932'' (master's thesis)
Lawrence Finn's page about Joan Manning-Sanders 
A Web site about illustrator Robin Jacques

External links

1886 births
1988 deaths
19th-century English people
19th-century English women
20th-century English novelists
20th-century English poets
20th-century English women writers
Alumni of the Victoria University of Manchester
Anglo-Welsh women poets
British centenarians
British women children's writers
Collectors of fairy tales
English children's writers
English folklorists
English women non-fiction writers
English women novelists
English women poets
People from Swansea
Women centenarians
Women folklorists
Women science fiction and fantasy writers